Man of the World 2018 was the 2nd edition of the Man of the World pageant. It was held on 14 July 2018 at Filoil Flying V Centre in San Juan, Philippines. Mostafa Galal Mohammed Elezali of Egypt crowned Cao Xuân Tài of Vietnam at the end of the event.

Results

Fast Track Events

Special Awards 

§ Automatic placement in the Top 17

Order Of Announcements

Top 17

Top 10

 

Top 5

Contestants

Notes

Crossover 
Major competitions
 Mister Global
 2016:  - Wiler Jair Choez Loor

 Minor competitions
 Mister United Continents
 2017:  - Majed Abumazyad

 Mister Universe Tourism
 2018:  - Majed Abumazyad

References 

Man of the World (pageant)
2018 beauty pageants
July 2018 events in the Philippines